, provisional designation , is a trans-Neptunian object and binary system from the classical Kuiper belt, located in the outermost region of the Solar System. It was first observed on 10 December 2001, by astronomers at the Mauna Kea Observatory, Hawaii. Its 140-kilometer sized companion was discovered by the Hubble Space Telescope in June 2006.

Discovery and orbit

 was discovered on 10 December 2001 by David C. Jewitt, Scott S. Sheppard and Jan Kleyna using 2.2-meter University of Hawaii reflector on Mauna Kea.  belongs to the dynamically cold population of the classical Kuiper belt objects, which small orbital eccentricities and inclinations. Their semi-major axes reside mainly in the interval 40–45 AU.

Satellite 

 is a binary consisting of two components of approximately equal size. Assuming that both components have the same albedo, the primary is estimated to be about 170 km in diameter. The size of the secondary (satellite) in this case is estimated at about 140 km. The total mass of the system is about 4 kg. The average density of both components is about 1 g/cm3.

Numbering and naming 

This minor planet was numbered by the Minor Planet Center on 18 May 2019. As of 2019, it has not been named.

Physical properties 

The surfaces of both components of  appear to have a neutral color.

Notes

References

External links 
 List of Transneptunian Objects, Minor Planet Center
 List of binary asteroids/TNOs, Johnston's Archive
 
 

524366
Discoveries by David C. Jewitt
Discoveries by Scott S. Sheppard
Discoveries by Jan Kleyna
524366
20011210